The singing honeyeater (Gavicalis virescens) is a small bird found in Australia, and is part of the honeyeater family Meliphagidae. The bird lives in a wide range of shrubland, woodland, and coastal habitat. It is relatively common and is widespread right across Australia west of the Great Dividing Range, through to the west coast and on Western Australian coastal islands. It does not occur in other countries.

Taxonomy
The singing honeyeater was originally described as Meliphaga virescens lipferti. It was previously placed in the genus Lichenostomus, but was moved to Gavicalis after a molecular phylogenetic analysis, published in 2011, showed that the original genus was polyphyletic. The generic name is formed from an anagram of the sister genus Caligavis; the specific epithet is the Latin virescens meaning 'greenish'.

Description
Their overall appearance is grey-brown. The tail and wings are olive-green with flashes of yellow. There is a broad, black stripe running from the behind the beak to the back, and a yellow streak immediately below this from the eye. The bird's song ranges from scratchy to melodious. The song also varies according to where they live. The singing honeyeater has close relatives that have a similar general appearance, or some details in common, with overlapping ranges and similar voices, so a bird identification guide with clear visuals may be essential to attain the correct identity.

Ecology
Singing honeyeaters eat a variety of foods, including nectar, small insects, fruits, grubs, and berries. This makes them omnivorous creatures.

Singing honeyeaters breed between July and February. They are capable of forming longtime relationships with partners. When they are breeding, they show aggressive actions. Their nest is a cup of grass, plant stems, and spider webs. The eggs are a light cream-brown with some darker spots.

Singing honeyeaters live in families. They will attack larger animals, if they feel threatened by them, or if they enter their territory. They have been known to attack intruders in mobs, thus showing they are a community-like bird.

They associate with other species of birds, such as the brown honeyeater and the red wattlebird. They are different from many birds, however, because they lack the ability to communicate with isolated birds of the same species. As a study by M.C. Baker (1996) showed, the birds of the mainland did not respond to the songs of singing honeyeaters found on an island off Australia's west coast. The study showed that the songs of the birds on the island were shorter, had less song and syllable types, and had fewer syllables and notes per song.

Gallery

References

External links 

 BirdLife Species Factsheet
Photos, audio and video of singing honeyeater from Cornell Lab of Ornithology's Macaulay Library
Recordings of singing honeyeater from Graeme Chapman's sound library
 Singing honeyeater. Birds of Perth
 "Singing honeyeater." birdphotos . 15 Dec 2006 

singing honeyeater
Endemic birds of Australia
singing honeyeater
Taxa named by Louis Jean Pierre Vieillot